The 12th Virginia Regiment was raised on September 16, 1776, at Williamsburg, Virginia, for service with the (U.S.) Continental Army. The regiment saw action in the Battle of Brandywine, Battle of Germantown, Battle of Monmouth and the Siege of Charleston. Most of the regiment was captured at Charlestown, South Carolina, on May 12, 1780, by the British and the regiment was formally disbanded on January 1, 1783.

From at least October 1777 until June 1778, the 12th Virginia Regiment was under the command of Colonel James Wood and contained companies under the command of the following captains:

October 1777 12th Virginia Regiment Company Commanders
Captain Andrew Waggoner
Captain Steven Ashby
Captain Michael Bowyer
Captain Thomas Bowyer
Captain Rowland Madison
Captain William Vause
Captain Andrew Wallace
Captain Samuel Lapsley
Captain Joseph Mitchel
Captain Johnathan Langdon

November 1777 12th Virginia Regiment Company Commanders
Captain Andrew Waggoner
Captain Steven Ashby
Captain Michael Bowyer
Captain Thomas Bowyer
Captain Rowland Madison
Captain William Vause
Captain Andrew Wallace
Captain Samuel Lapsley
Captain Joseph Mitchel
Captain Johnathan Langdon

December 1777 12th Virginia Regiment Company Commanders
Captain Andrew Waggoner
Captain Steven Ashby
Captain Michael Bowyer
Captain Thomas Bowyer
Captain Benjamin Casey
Captain Rowland Madison
Captain William Vause
Captain Andrew Wallace
Captain Samuel Lapsley

January 1778 12th Virginia Regiment Company Commanders
Captain Andrew Waggoner
Captain Steven Ashby
Captain Michael Bowyer
Captain Thomas Bowyer
Captain Benjamin Casey
Captain Rowland Madison
Captain William Vause
Captain Andrew Wallace
Captain Samuel Lapsley

February 1778 12th Virginia Regiment Company Commanders
Captain Andrew Waggoner
Captain Steven Ashby
Captain Michael Bowyer
Captain Thomas Bowyer
Captain Benjamin Casey
Captain Rowland Madison
Captain William Vause
Captain Andrew Wallace
Captain Samuel Lapsley

March 1778 12th Virginia Regiment Company Commanders
Captain Andrew Waggoner
Captain Steven Ashby
Captain Michael Bowyer
Captain Thomas Bowyer
Captain Benjamin Casey
Captain Rowland Madison
Captain William Vause
Captain Andrew Wallace
Captain Samuel Lapsley

April 1778 12th Virginia Regiment Company Commanders
Captain Andrew Waggoner
Captain Steven Ashby
Captain Michael Bowyer
Captain Thomas Bowyer
Captain Benjamin Casey
Captain Rowland Madison
Captain William Vause
Captain Andrew Wallace
Captain Samuel Lapsley

May 1778 12th Virginia Regiment Company Commanders
Captain Andrew Waggoner
Captain Steven Ashby
Captain Michael Bowyer
Captain Thomas Bowyer
Captain Benjamin Casey
Captain Rowland Madison
Captain William Vause
Captain Andrew Wallace
Captain Samuel Lapsley

References

External links
Bibliography of the Continental Army in Virginia compiled by the United States Army Center of Military History

12th Virginia Regiment